The Shirabad Formation is a late Albian geologic formation in Tajikistan.

Fossil content 
Fossil ankylosaur tracks described as Macropodosauropus gravis have been reported from the formation.

See also 
 List of dinosaur-bearing rock formations
 List of stratigraphic units with ornithischian tracks
 Ankylosaur tracks

References

Bibliography 
  
 

Geologic formations of Tajikistan
Lower Cretaceous Series of Asia
Albian Stage
Sandstone formations
Evaporite deposits
Shallow marine deposits
Ichnofossiliferous formations
Paleontology in Tajikistan